CAFA or Cafa may refer to:

CAFA
 Caithness Amateur Football Association
 Canadian Airborne Forces Association
 Canadian Arts and Fashion Awards
 Central Academy of Fine Arts, China
 Central Asian Football Association
 Class Action Fairness Act of 2005, U.S.
 Committee for Academic Freedom in Africa
 Critical Assessment of Function Annotation
 Critics Adult Film Association, U.S.
 Republic of China Air Force Academy, a military academy in Taiwan

Cafa
 Ćafa, Podgorica, Montenegro
 Melchiorre Cafà (1636–1667), Maltese Baroque sculptor

See also
 Caffa, a 13th–15th-century Genoese colony